The 2020–present United States ammunition shortage is the most recent of all the ammunition shortages in the United States. It arose out of the COVID-19 pandemic in the United States, the 2020 United States presidential election, and the George Floyd protests. The lack of sufficient ammunition for consumers in the United States is ongoing.

Causes

Large increase in new gun owners 
An estimated 8.4 million people bought firearms for the first time in 2020, according to an official of the National Shooting Sports Foundation, and they are also buying ammunition.

COVID-19 pandemic 
In March 2020, COVID-19 was declared a pandemic by WHO, followed by world leaders such as the US President. Firearm and ammunition sales have increased substantially since the pandemic. At least 3 million firearms were sold in the spring alone.

George Floyd riots 
In response to riots and unrest after the murder of George Floyd, many started buying arms and ammunition.

2020 Presidential election 
The 2020 presidential election resulted in an election victory of the Democratic Party nominee Joe Biden. Biden has proposed multiple forms of gun control, such as ammunition magazine capacity limits, reinstating the federal assault weapon ban, universal background checks, and closing the gun show loophole. When Biden was Vice-president from 2009 to 2017, he and former president Barack Obama proposed the Assault Weapons Ban of 2013 following the Sandy Hook elementary school shooting.

Decreased supply
The pandemic reduced the production and import of certain raw materials, including lead, required to manufacture ammunition.

On July 28, 2020, Remington Outdoor Company filed for Chapter 11 bankruptcy protection. Vista Outdoor purchased Remington's ammunition plants and brands at auction in September 2020. Chris Metz, Vista Outdoor's chief executive officer, said of Remington's ammunition plant in Arkansas that "during the bankruptcy the plant was functioning at about 10% capacity before Vista Outdoor took over." In April 2021, Remington Ammunition announced that its Arkansas plant was back to running 24/7 at full capacity.

Hoarding and scalping 
Retailers say many customers are buying more ammunition than they normally would, from fear of supplies running out. Resellers are also reportedly buying large amounts of ammunition and reselling it at higher prices to customers who are willing to pay more to obtain it during the shortage.

References

Ammunition
Gun politics in the United States
2020 in the United States
2020s economic history
Scarcity